A general utility van (GUV) is a type of rail vehicle built by British Rail primarily for transporting mail and parcels. They were used by both Rail Express Systems and Railtrack. Colas Rail and some train operating companies still use them.

British Rail

Fleet details

Livery examples

Preservation
Many GUVs have found new uses on preserved lines in the UK either stored and kept as coaches or converted for uses as different things.

PMV
The Southern Railway used the designation PMV (Parcels and Miscellaneous Van).

References

British Rail coaching stock
British railway wagons
Train-related introductions in 1956